The 2020–21 Detroit Red Wings season was the 95th season for the National Hockey League (NHL) franchise that was established on September 25, 1926. It was the Red Wings' fourth season at Little Caesars Arena. 

On December 20, 2020, the league temporarily realigned into four divisions with no conferences due to the COVID-19 pandemic and the ongoing closure of the Canada–United States border. As a result of this realignment the Red Wings returned to the Central Division for the first time since 2012–13 and only played games against the other teams in their new division during the regular season.

On April 26, the Red Wings were eliminated from playoff contention for the fifth consecutive season, after the Nashville Predators defeated the Florida Panthers.

Standings

Divisional standings

Schedule and results

Regular season

Awards and honours

Awards

Milestones

Transactions
The Red Wings have been involved in the following transactions during the 2020–21 season.

Trades

Free agents

Contract terminations

Retirement

Signings

Draft picks

Below are the Detroit Red Wings' selections at the 2020 NHL Entry Draft, which was held on October 6 and 7, 2020, via video conference call due to the COVID-19 pandemic

Notes:
 The Edmonton Oilers' fourth-round pick went to the Detroit Red Wings as the result of a trade on February 23, 2020, that sent Mike Green to Edmonton in exchange for Kyle Brodziak and this pick (being conditional at the time of the trade).

References

Detroit Red Wings
Detroit Red Wings
Detroit Red Wings
Detroit Red Wings seasons